Polideportivo Municipal José Antonio Gasca is an indoor arena located in San Sebastián, Spain.  It is primarily used for basketball and the home stadium of Askatuak SBT, San Sebastián Gipuzkoa BC and CD Ibaeta.

The arena holds 2,500 people.

Formerly known as Polideportivo de Anoeta, it was renamed after José Antonio Gasca on February 25, 1992.

References

J.A. Gasca
J.A. Gasca
J.A. Gasca
Sports venues in the Basque Country (autonomous community)